Gary Richards (born on December 31, 1970), known by his stage name Destructo, is an American music executive, concert promoter, and DJ. As of September 1, 2017, he is the President of LiveStyle, North America.  Prior to joining LiveStyle, he was the founder and CEO of HARD Events, a concert brand that has put on popular music festivals since 2007, and which was acquired in 2012 by Live Nation Entertainment. He has performed professionally as a DJ under the name Destructo  for over 20 years, having toured around the world. He is credited with being a leader in the Electronic music business in North America, and through his events, has helped bring artists like Deadmau5 and Justice into the mainstream.  Richards is included on Rolling Stone's "50 Most Important People in EDM" list, Billboard's "EDM Power Players" lists from 2014 - 2017, and inthemix's list of the "50 Most Powerful People in EDM". As Destructo, he has released four EP's titled Technology, Higher, West Coast, and RENEGADE respectively.

Early life
Richards  grew up in Washington, D.C. with much exposure to the music industry, as his father worked on the radio and in concert promotion. By age 10, living in Potomac, MD he was already attending concerts with his father, Barry "Reazar" Richards- by the likes of Led Zeppelin and Alice Cooper. His family moved to New Orleans, LA, and then to Myrtle Beach, SC, where he worked as an on-air Radio Personality. The family then moved to Los Angeles, CA, where by age 18 he was booking his first shows and performing as a DJ.

Career

Concert promotion and A&R
Entranced by the early 1990s warehouse scene, Richards hosted a weekly event of his own called "The Sermon" and helped bring attention to many L.A. nightlife hotspots including The Standard Hotel - Downtown. He organized his first major music event titled "Magical Mickey's Holy Water Adventure" at Wild Rivers (water park) in Irvine, CA in 1991. For the next two years, Richards produced monthly events including the first two "Electric Daisy Carnivals" in 1991 and 1992. After being asked by promoter Pasquale Rotella to use the name "Electric Daisy Carnival" for a series of concert festivals that he was producing, Richards granted him permission to do so in 1997. The Electric Daisy Carnival or "EDC" is now arguably the largest electronic music festival in North America. He followed "Electric Daisy Carnival" with presenting "RaveAmerica" at Knott's Berry Farm in Buena Park, CA on New Year's Eve, 1993. Developing a reputation in the music industry as having a good ear for music and launching new artists with his events, Gary Richards was handpicked by Rick Rubin to handle A&R duties for the Electronic music division at Def American Recordings, where signed and developed Lords of Acid, XL Recordings, Messiah, Digital Orgasm, Harthouse Records and God Lives Underwater. He went on to establish his own record labels Nitrus Records and 1500 Records which released music from Kill The Noise, Whitey, David Holmes, Überzone, Dub Pistols, Ugly Duckling, the critically acclaimed Depeche Mode tribute album For the Masses, and the original motion picture soundtrack for 15 Minutes.

Destructo
In the mid-1990s, Gary Richards began performing as a DJ under the name Destructo. He is quoted as saying that the Destructo name derives from "My goal to play the hardest and most gnarly techno out there. I'd blow up the sound system and the mixer at clubs if I could. I wasn't only into Kraftwerk and Daft Punk; I loved Metallica and Black Sabbath as well. So when I performed, it was aggressive and had to be banging." He has released remixes for Warren G, Depeche Mode, Major Lazer, YG, White Zombie, Digitalism, and others. In 2012 he released his debut EP titled Technology. He has performed around the world for more than a decade, sharing the stage with some of the biggest names in Electronic music. Destructo's second EP titled Higher was released on June 10, 2013, via Owsla/Boysnoize Records and features remixes by Tommy Trash and Brodinski. The music video for the EP's title track was directed by Agata Alexander. On November 24, 2014, Destructo released the West Coast EP on Interscope Records which featured appearances by YG, Problem, Ty Dolla Sign, Kurupt, Too Short, and Warren G. This release took the precision-guided producer in the realm of G-house (where rap melds with house music) introducing his singular solo style. His fourth EP RENEGADE was released on March 31, 2017, on his label HITS HARD.  It features collaborations with E-40 and Too $hort, Ty Dolla $ign & iLoveMakonnen Pusha T & Starrah, Problem and Freddie Gibbs. Starting 2018 off strong, Destructo hit the road on his “Let’s Be Friends” Tour. The bassline aficionado kicked off his tour on Friday, January 19 at the Output in Brooklyn, NY and continued his tour with 15 more dates in major cities across North America.

HARD Events
As the music industry continued to change at the turn of the century, Richards returned to his roots as a concert promoter, launching the very first HARD Events festival in 2007. The festival's success soon lead Gary Richards and HARD Events to become a major player in EDM concert promotion, and by 2010, the company was hosting 3 major music festivals, as well as numerous club and theater shows across the United States. It is estimated that HARD Events draw a cumulative audience of more than 100,000 people per year to its events. In 2016, HARD Summer drew as many as 150,000 attendees to its two-day festival. Past performers at HARD Events festivals include Deadmau5, Skrillex, Underworld, Diplo, M.I.A., Justice, A-Trak, Steve Aoki, Busy P, Boys Noize, N.E.R.D., Crystal Castles, Digitalism, and many more. In 2012, HARD Events was acquired by Live Nation Entertainment with the intent of expanding its music events into new international markets.

LiveStyle
On September 5, 2017, Randy Phillips, President/CEO of LiveStyle, Inc. announced that Gary Richards has joined the company as President of LiveStyle North America. In this newly created position at LiveStyle, Richards is responsible for working with all of LiveStyle's current U.S. festival operations, developing and launching new brands and activities on the West Coast. North American key operating entities for the company include Made Event, React Presents, Disco Donnie Presents, Life in Color, and MMG, along with festivals and brands such as Electric Zoo, Spring Awakening, TomorrowWorld, Sensation, and Life in Color. Phillips commented, “When Chuck Ciongoli and I took over the former SFX, the global leader in electronic music festivals and the parent company of Beatport, we rebranded it LiveStyle to signal that a new vibrant business was emerging debt-free with some of the greatest assets in the live entertainment industry.  To complete our executive suite, we wanted to bring some real authenticity to the management of LiveStyle, and no single candidate to be the President of North America fulfills this role better than Gary Richards, of HARD and Holy Ship fame. In fact, this is a delayed goal for me since I tried to make a deal with Gary 10 years ago while I was running AEG Live. Not only is he an accomplished working DJ (DJ Destructo), but he is also a very astute businessman with an affinity to his fellow artists.  With Gary on board, LiveStyle is prepared for creative and strategic growth in the years ahead.”

Personal life
In 2003, he married Anne (née Varnishung) Richards, a model. They have two children.

Discography

Select remixes

References

External links

American music industry executives
20th-century American Jews
Living people
1970 births
Owsla artists
21st-century American Jews